Myanmar women's national under-17 football team is Controlled by Myanmar Football Federation.

AFC U-16 Women's Championship

  2005 to  2007 = Did Not Enter
  2009 = Group Stage
  2011 to  2019 = Did Not Qualify

FIFA U-17 Women's World Cup

  2008 = Did not Participate
  2010 to  2020 = Did Not Qualify

AFF U-15 Women's Championship

  2009 = Fourth Place
  2017 = Third Place
  2018 = Runner's Up
  2019 = Group Stage

Asian women's national under-17 association football teams
U-17